Dharampur Legislative Assembly constituency is one of the seventy electoral Uttarakhand Legislative Assembly constituencies of Uttarakhand state in India. In 2017 Vidhan Sabha election BJP won this seat from Congress.

Dharampur Legislative Assembly constituency is a part of Haridwar (Lok Sabha constituency).

Members of Legislative Assembly

Election results

2022

See also
 Lakshman Chowk (Uttarakhand Assembly constituency)

References

External link
  
http://eci.nic.in/eci_main/CurrentElections/CONSOLIDATED_ORDER%20_ECI%20.pdf. The Election Commission of India. p. 509.
http://election.uk.gov.in/Vidhan_sabha2012/form20_2012_PDF/21-Dehradun%20Cantonment.pdf
http://ceo.uk.gov.in/files/Election2012/RESULTS_2012_Uttarakhand_State.pdf
https://web.archive.org/web/20090619064401/http://gov.ua.nic.in/ceouttranchal/ceo/ac_pc.aspx
https://web.archive.org/web/20101201021552/http://gov.ua.nic.in/ceouttranchal/ceo/ac_detl.aspx

2002 establishments in Uttarakhand
Assembly constituencies of Uttarakhand
Constituencies established in 2002
Politics of Dehradun